Half Life is the 2006 debut novel of American writer and artist Shelley Jackson.  The novel presupposes an alternate history in which the atomic bomb resulted in a genetic preponderance of conjoined twins, who eventually become a minority subculture.

Overview
The book tells the story of a disenchanted conjoined twin named Nora Olney who plots to have her twin murdered.

Reception
Half Life received mixed-to-positive reviews; Newsweek called it "brilliant and funny," and The New York Times, while praising Jackson's ambition as "truly glorious," added that "All this razzle-dazzle, all the allusions, [and] the narrative loop-de-loops [get] a bit busy."  It won the 2006 James Tiptree, Jr. Award for science fiction and fantasy.

References

2006 American novels
American alternate history novels
Fictional conjoined twins
James Tiptree Jr. Award-winning works
HarperCollins books
2006 debut novels